Blistrup is a town in the Gribskov Municipality in North Zealand, Denmark. As of 2022, it has a population of 1,175.

References 

Cities and towns in the Capital Region of Denmark
Gribskov Municipality